Maren Derlien (born 17 December 1975 in Hamburg) is a German rower. In 1999 she won the World Rowing Championships in St. Catharines, Canada in the quad sculls boat. In 2005, 2006 and 2007 she also rowed at the World Rowing Championships.  She represented her native country at the 2004 Summer Olympics in Athens, Greece and at the 2008 Summer Olympics in Beijing, China.

Club
In 2008 Derlien rowed for RG Hansa Hamburg in Hamburg.

References

External links
 http://www.frauenachter.de 

1975 births
Living people
German female rowers
Olympic rowers of Germany
Rowers at the 2004 Summer Olympics
Rowers at the 2008 Summer Olympics
Rowers from Hamburg
World Rowing Championships medalists for Germany
European Rowing Championships medalists